Rhynchopyga braconida is a species of moth in the subfamily Arctiinae. It was described by William James Kaye in 1911. It is found in São Paulo, Brazil.

References

Moths described in 1911
Euchromiina